Al-Haditha is a small town in Saudi Arabia 25 km from Al Qurayyat, near the border with Jordan.

Transport 

It is on the route of a proposed railway connection Saudi Arabia with Jordan. This railway if extended would align with Damascus in Syria. See Saudi Railways Organization for more information. There is an airport about 20 km from Haditha, Gurayat Domestic Airport.

See also 

 Railway stations in Saudi Arabia

Namesake 

There is a village in Jordan with a similar name.

References 

Populated places in Saudi Arabia